Simha Babah (born 27 November 1902, died 10 December 1973) was an Israeli politician who served as a member of the Knesset for the General Zionists between 1951 and 1959.

Biography
Born in an area that was later to become part of Poland, Babah was a member of the central committee of the Polish branch of the Zionist Organization, and was also a member of Et Livnot. He edited the Yiddish language newspaper Zionist World.

In 1933, he made aliyah to Mandatory Palestine. After World War II he headed the body responsible for absorbing demobilized soldiers, and in 1948 he became deputy director of the soldiers department of the Ministry of Defense.

A member of the General Zionists, he was elected to the Knesset on the party's list in 1951. He was re-elected in 1955, but lost his seat in the 1959 elections.

He died in 1973 at the age of 71.

References

External links
 

1902 births
1973 deaths
Polish emigrants to Mandatory Palestine
Ashkenazi Jews in Mandatory Palestine
Israeli civil servants
General Zionists politicians
Members of the 2nd Knesset (1951–1955)
Members of the 3rd Knesset (1955–1959)